Aida Baraku (born 10 June 1967) is an Albanian Kosovar singer, composer, and journalist.

Life 
Baraku wrote for newspapers like "Zëri" and "Koha Ditore". She worked as a director for the entertainment shows at Radio Televizioni i Kosovës.

Together with her husband, they ran the first seasons of "E Diell" (It's Sunday), a Sunday-show at Top Channel which was one of the most watched shows in the Albanian-speaking territories during that time. She has two sisters.

References

Living people
Writers from Pristina
20th-century Albanian women singers
21st-century Albanian women singers
Musicians from Pristina
1966 births